BELIMO Holding AG, an international group of companies, is located in Hinwil, Switzerland. The company develops, produces and markets actuators for controlling heating, ventilation and air conditioning systems. Actuators and control valves make up the company's core business, and it is considered a global leader in motor control for HVAC. Newer products have integrated sensors and control electronics using ASICs.
 
BELIMO Holding AG employs  2163 people and generated sales of 847 million Swiss Francs in 2022. The company is listed on the Swiss stock exchange (BEAN), and has been since 1995.

History 
The company was founded in 1975 as BELIMO Automation AG. BELIMO is an acronym of three German words: "beraten" (advise), "liefern" (deliver) and "montieren" (install).  Belimo specialized in actuators, which were delivered in 1976 for the first time. The first sales company was opened in Germany in Stuttgart in 1977. In 1979, the company's headquarters was moved to Wetzikon, Switzerland.

In the mid-1980s,  representatives in England, Finland, Norway, Austria, Denmark, France, Sweden and the Netherlands became independent distributors. The company expanded with the founding of BELIMO Aircontrols in the United States in 1989.

In the 1990s, various Belimo subsidiaries were founded: Spain in 1990; Austria, Great Britain and France in 1993 and 1994; Canada in 1995; and Hong Kong in 1997. In the meantime, BELIMO Automation AG became a public company in 1995. In 1998, the company's name was changed to BELIMO Holding AG.

International expansion continued into the 2000s, with the establishment of subsidiaries in Singapore, Poland, Sweden, Australia, India and China.

In November 2002, the company moved into its new manufacturing and administration building in Hinwil, consolidating all sites in the Zurich Oberland region. At the same time, the headquarters was moved to Hinwil from Wetzikon.

In 2013, Belimo expanded its US site at Danbury, Connecticut, to better serve the American markets. It is used for manufacturing, logistics and administration.

In 2020, Belimo acquired Montreal-based Opera Electronics Inc., a specialist for gas detectors and sensors to monitor the quality of air.

Awards 
 2020: ControlTends (US) Best technical support company for the large manufacturer.
 2020: German trade magazine CCI (HVAC industry): Confidence Award.

References 

Heating, ventilation, and air conditioning companies
Swiss brands
Companies based in Danbury, Connecticut
Companies listed on the SIX Swiss Exchange